Opountioi is a former municipality in Phthiotis, Greece with an area 129.534 km2 and a population of 3,201 inhabitants (2011 census). It was established in 1997 from the former communities Larymna and Martino. The name refers to the ancient Greek city Opus. Since the 2011 local government reform, it is a part of the municipality Lokroi, of which it is a municipal unit. The seat of the municipality was Martino (pop. 1,923 in 2011).

References

External links
 Municipality of Opountioi 

Populated places in Phthiotis